Lod Municipal Stadium (Itztadion Ironi Lod) is a football stadium in Neot Itzhak neighborhood of Lod, Israel. It is currently the home stadium of Hapoel Bnei Lod. 

The stadium was built in the 1960s to accommodate Lod's football clubs of Beitar, Maccabi and Hapoel, but fell into disuse and disrepair after the city's major club closed. In 2010, the city was granted 10 million NIS by The Israeli Sports Betting Council, which was used, in part, to renovate the stadium. The stadium was further renovated ahead of the 2015 UEFA Women's Under-19 Championship, in which the stadium hosted 4 matches.

Adjacent to the stadium are three pitches, including a synthetic pitch, used by the city's minor teams, Hapoel Lod (which also host matches in the main stadium) and F.C. Tzeirei Lod.

See also
Sports in Israel

References 

 

Hapoel Bnei Lod F.C.
Sport in Lod
Football venues in Israel
Sports venues in Central District (Israel)